Tino Ausenda (16 May 1919 – 7 February 1976) was an Italian racing cyclist. He rode in the 1949 Tour de France.

References

External links
 

1919 births
1976 deaths
Italian male cyclists
Cyclists from the Province of Lecco